The 2018 South American Under-20 Women's Futsal Championship  is the 2nd edition of the South American Under-20 Women's Futsal Championship, the biennial international youth futsal championship organised by the CONMEBOL for the women's under-20 national teams of South America. The tournament is held in Santiago, Chile between 21–28 October 2018.

Teams
All ten CONMEBOL member national teams entered the tournament.

 (title holders)
 (hosts)

Venues
All matches are played in one venue: Polideportivo del Estadio Nacional in Santiago.

Draw
The draw of the tournament was held on 5 October 2018. The ten teams were drawn into two groups of five teams. The defending champions Brazil and the hosts Chile were seeded into Groups A and B respectively, while the remaining teams were placed into four "pairing pots" according to their results in the 2016 South American Under-20 Women's Futsal Championship: Colombia–Paraguay, Uruguay–Bolivia, Peru–Venezuela, Ecuador–Argentina.

Group stage
All times are local, CLST (UTC−3).

Group A

Group B

Knockout stage

Bracket

Semi-finals

Ninth place play-off

Seventh place play-off

Fifth place play-off

Third place play-off

Final

Final ranking

References

External links
Sudamericano Sub 20 Femenino de Futsal, ANFP.cl

2018 Under-20 Women's
2018 in South American futsal
2018 in Chilean football
October 2018 sports events in South America
2018 South American Under-20 Women's Futsal Championship